Desogestrel/ethinylestradiol (EE/DSG), sold under the brand name Marvelon among others, is a fixed-dose combination of desogestrel (DSG), a progestin, and ethinylestradiol (EE), an estrogen, which is used as a birth control pill to prevent pregnancy in women. It is taken by mouth.

It was approved for medical use in the United Kingdom in 1981, and in the United States in 1992. In 2020, it was the 120th most commonly prescribed medication in the United States, with more than 5million prescriptions.

See also
 List of combined sex-hormonal preparations § Estrogens and progestogens

References

Combined oral contraceptives